The 1962–63 Soviet Championship League season was the 17th season of the Soviet Championship League, the top level of ice hockey in the Soviet Union. 20 teams participated in the league, and CSKA Moscow won the championship.

First round

Final round

Relegation round

External links
Season on hockeystars.ru

Soviet
Soviet League seasons
1962–63 in Soviet ice hockey